S. Muthiah is an Indian politician who was elected to the 15th Tamil Nadu Legislative Assembly in the 2016 elections from the Paramakudi constituency. He was a candidate of the All India Anna Dravida Munnetra Kazhagam party.

He was one of the 18 members who were disqualified were disqualified by Speaker P. Dhanapal as they withdrew support to Chief Minister Edappadi K. Palaniswami and became loyal to rebel leader T.T.V. Dhinakaran and joined his party Amma Makkal Munnetra Kazhagam.

References 

Living people
All India Anna Dravida Munnetra Kazhagam politicians
Tamil Nadu MLAs 2016–2021
Year of birth missing (living people)
Amma Makkal Munnetra Kazhagam politicians